Claytonia lanceolata is a species of wildflower in the family Montiaceae, known by the common names lanceleaf springbeauty and western springbeauty.

Description 
This somewhat rare plant is native to western North America, growing in the sagebrush steppe and foothills up to alpine slopes. It thrives in the rocky soil of alpine climates where the snow never melts. It is a perennial herb growing from a tuber one to three centimeters wide. At its smallest the plant bears only its first two rounded leaves before flowering and dying back. Its thick leaves are helpful for storing water. If it continues to grow it produces two thick, lance-shaped leaves further up the stem. The star-shaped flowers come in inflorescences of three to fifteen blooms and they are white or pink, often with veiny stripes and yellow blotches near the base of each petal. The fruit is a small capsule containing a few seeds, which are black and shiny.

Uses 
The entire plant is edible raw or cooked, including the potato-like corm from which it grows. Some report that the bulbs must be cooked to remove toxins.

Native Americans ate the roots and pods, which can be cooked and eaten like potatoes. The leaves can be eaten raw or cooked.

The Okanogan-Colville, Okanogan, and Nlaka'pamux Native American peoples used the tuber of this plant for food and for animal fodder.

References

External links

 Calflora Database: Claytonia lanceolata (Lanceleaf springbeauty,  Western spring beauty)
Jepson eFlora (TJM2) treatment of Claytonia lanceolata
Ethnobotany
UC CalPhotos gallery of Claytonia lanceolata

lanceolata
Edible plants
Flora of the Northwestern United States
Flora of the Southwestern United States
Flora of California
Flora of New Mexico
Flora of Western Canada
Flora of the Sierra Nevada (United States)
Flora without expected TNC conservation status